What's in a Name? is a 1934 British comedy film directed by Ralph Ince and starring Carol Goodner, Barry Clifton and Reginald Purdell. It was made at Teddington Studios by the British subsidiary of Warner Brothers.

Cast
 Carol Goodner as Marta Radovic  
 Barry Clifton as George Andrews
 Reginald Purdell as Harry Stubbs  
 Gyles Isham as Schultz  
 Eve Gray as Mrs. Schultz  
 Ernest Sefton as Light  
 George Zucco as Foot  
 Winifred Oughton as Maid

References

Bibliography
 Low, Rachael. Filmmaking in 1930s Britain. George Allen & Unwin, 1985.
 Wood, Linda. British Films, 1927-1939. British Film Institute, 1986.

External links

1934 films
British comedy films
1934 comedy films
1930s English-language films
Films shot at Teddington Studios
Films directed by Ralph Ince
British black-and-white films
1930s British films